The Basic Principles for the Treatment of Prisoners were adopted and proclaimed by the General Assembly of the United Nations by resolution 45/111 on 14 December 1990.

Article 1 protects the human dignity. Article 2 bans discrimination.

References 

United Nations General Assembly resolutions
Human rights
Prisoners and detainees
Discrimination
1990 in law